GameSurge is a popular Internet Relay Chat network devoted to the online multiplayer gaming community.  Games commonly seen referenced on GameSurge include many first person shooters (such as Counter-Strike, Counter-Strike: Source, Team Fortress Classic, Team Fortress 2, Day of Defeat, Call of Duty, and Battlefield 2) and MMORPGs (such as World of Warcraft and Guild Wars).

GameSurge is consistently in the top 20 IRC Networks by users currently online.

History
GameSurge was created in February 2004, as a result of the merger of GamesNET users and the ProGamePlayer Network, a network with common interests. The merger, coincidentally, occurred during a time of legal disputes over the domain name gamesnet.net.

At present day, the user base of GameSurge is primarily North American, with a growing number of English-speaking gamers from Europe. The user base contains a large number of clans who participate in a wide variety of games. Among the more popular games on GameSurge are Counter-Strike, Counter-Strike: Source, Team Fortress Classic, Team Fortress 2, Day of Defeat, Urban Terror and Call of Duty.

Services 
GameSurge runs a feature-rich package of services known as srvx, which was written by GameSurge's development staff from scratch in C.

GameSurge provides five user-accessible services:
 AuthServ, which provides authentication for other services on the network and allows users to use an account to maintain channel access.  In the interests of providing a service directed toward gaming (and thus allowing users to easily switch clan/team/guild tags), GameSurge does not provide nickname registration.
 ChanServ, which provides facilities such as event logging and advanced user/ban management.
 HelpServ bots, which manage support requests in certain channels via a FIFO queue.
 HelpServ, in the #support channel, for general user support.
 Other HelpServ bots in miscellaneous help channels throughout the network.
 SpamServ, which provides spam protection services to channels on the network.
 HostServ, which provides free "titles" to users wishing to use cloaked hosts.  See the GameSurge Titles page for details.

References

External links
 GameSurge
 srvx (network services for GameSurge)
 GameSurge Servers

Internet Relay Chat networks